Tectona is a genus of tropical hardwood trees in the mint family, Lamiaceae. The three species are often collectively called teak.

Description
Tectona is native to south and southeast Asia, mainly India, Pakistan, Bangladesh, Myanmar, Indonesia and Thailand, and are commonly found as a component of monsoon forest vegetation. They are large trees, growing to 30–40 m (90–120 ft.) tall, deciduous in the dry season. Tectona grandis is an economically important species which is the source of most commercial teak wood products.

Systematics
Teak belongs to the family Lamiaceae (in older classifications in Verbenaceae). Sometimes it is included in the subfamily Prostantheroideae.
There are three species of Tectona:
 Tectona grandis (common teak) is by far the most important, with a wide distribution in Bangladesh, Sri Lanka, Myanmar, Thailand, China, India, and Pakistan.
 Tectona hamiltoniana (Dahat teak) is a local endemic species confined to Burma, where it is endangered.
 Tectona philippinensis (Philippine teak) is endemic to the Philippines, and is critically endangered according to the IUCN (http://iucnredlist.org/details/32123/0).

The genus Tectona is a conserved name against the earlier homotypic synonym Theka Adans. The genus was originally described by Carl Linnaeus the Younger in 1782.

The biggest and oldest teak 
The biggest and oldest teak is in Uttaradit, Thailand.  It is more than 1,500 years old. Its height is 47 metres.

References 

Lamiaceae
Lamiaceae genera